Lone Star, Lone Starr, Lone Stars or Lonestar may also refer to:

Communities in the United States 
 Lone Star, Arizona, a populated place
 Lone Star, Fresno County, California, an unincorporated community
 Lone Star, Humboldt County, California, a former settlement
 Lone Star, Kansas, an unincorporated community
 Lone Star, Kentucky, an unincorporated community
 Lone Star, Missouri, an unincorporated community
 Lone Star, South Carolina, an unincorporated community
 Lone Star, Texas, a city
 Lone Star, Cherokee County, Texas, a ghost town
 Lone Star, Kaufman County, Texas, an unincorporated community
 Lone Star, Virginia, an unincorporated community

Businesses

Media
 KZPS ("Lone Star 92.5"), a radio station serving the Dallas/Fort Worth market in Texas
 Lone Star Music, a New Braunfels, Texas-based music company
 Lone Star Productions, a Poverty Row producer of John Wayne western films in the 1930s, released through Monogram Pictures
 Lonestar Productions, an Australian film production company headed by Aaron Fa'aoso
 MovieTime (originally named Lonestar), a Canadian digital cable specialty channel

Others
 Lone Star Brewing Company, the first large, mechanized brewery in Texas
 Lonestar Cell, a telecommunication company in Liberia
 Lone Star Comics, a former chain of comic book stores in the Dallas-Fort Worth area
 Lone Star Funds, a worldwide private equity firm based in Dallas, Texas
 Lone Star Steakhouse & Saloon, a casual dining restaurant chain
 Lone Star Toys, the name used by British company Die Cast Machine Tools Ltd for its toy products

Transportation 
 International LoneStar, a heavy duty truck manufactured by International Truck
 Lone Star (1920 automobile), an early American automobile manufactured by Lone Star Motor Truck and Tractor Corp. from 1920 to 1922
 Lone Star Airlines, an American regional airline that operated domestic and international flights from 1984 to 1998
 Lone Star (Amtrak train), an Amtrak passenger train serving Chicago, Kansas City, Oklahoma City, Fort Worth, and Houston from 1971 to 1974
 Lone Star (SSW train), a passenger train operated by St. Louis Southwestern Railway between Memphis and Dallas that discontinued service in 1952
 Lone Star (steamer), wrecked near Galveston, Texas in 1865
 Lone Star (towboat), a National Historic Landmark dry docked in Le Claire, Iowa

Film and television 
 Lone Star (1952 film), a Western starring Clark Gable, Ava Gardner and Broderick Crawford
 Lone Star (1996 film), an American mystery film written and directed by John Sayles
 Captain Lone Starr, a main protagonist in the 1987 Mel Brooks film Spaceballs
 Lone Star (TV series), a short-lived American television series 
 9-1-1: Lone Star, an American procedural drama TV series
 "Lone Star", a 1954 episode of Hallmark Hall of Fame

Music 
 Lone Star (band), a Welsh rock band formed in 1975
 Lone Star (album), the debut album of the Welsh band
 Lonestar, an American country music band
 Lonestar (album), the debut album of the American band

Sports 
 Austin Lone Stars, a soccer club that competed in the SISL, USISL and United Soccer Leagues from 1987 to 2000
 Liberia national football team (nicknamed the Lone Stars), national team of Liberia, controlled by the Liberia Football Association
 Lone Star Football League, a regional professional indoor football league from 2012 to 2014
 Lone Star League, the name of three American minor professional baseball leagues in Texas, all defunct
 Lone Star Conference, a college athletic conference
 Lone Star Park, a horse racing track in Grand Prairie, Texas
 Lone Star Series, an indoor football league that operated during 2021, later named the Arena Football Association
 Lone Star 500, a NASCAR race in 1972, renamed the Alamo 500

Military 
 36th Infantry Division (United States) or Lone Star Division, now part of the Texas National Guard
 49th Armored Division (United States), nicknamed the Lone Star, a United States Army National Guard unit
 Lone Star Army Ammunition Plant, a former government-owned facility near Texarkana, Texas

People 
 William Henry Dietz (1884–1964), nicknamed "Lone Star", American football player and coach
 John Pendleton (1802–1868), nicknamed "The Lone Star", American congressman, diplomat, lawyer and farmer

Other uses 
 Lone Star College System a public community college system serving the northern portions of the Greater Houston, Texas
 Lone Star Geyser, Yellowstone National Park, Wyoming
 Lone Star High School (Frisco, Texas), a public high school
 The Lone Star, a barque featured in the Sherlock Holmes story "The Five Orange Pips"

See also
 
 
 Lone star flag (disambiguation) 
 Lone Star Series, the rivalry between the Houston Astros and Texas Rangers of Major League Baseball
 Intergalactic star, a star not gravitationally bound to any galaxy

Lists of people by nickname